CD1D is the human gene that encodes the protein CD1d, a member of the CD1 (cluster of differentiation 1) family of glycoproteins expressed on the surface of various human antigen-presenting cells. They are non-classical MHC proteins, related to the class I MHC proteins, and are involved in the presentation of lipid antigens to T cells. CD1d is the only member of the group 2 CD1 molecules.

Biological significance
CD1d-presented lipid antigens activate a special class of T cells, known as natural killer T (NKT) cells, through the interaction with the T-cell receptor present on NKT membranes. When activated, NKT cells rapidly produce Th1 and Th2 cytokines, typically represented by interferon-gamma and interleukin 4 production.

Nomenclature
CD1d is also known as R3G1

Ligands
Some of the known ligands for CD1d are:
 α-galactosylceramide (α-GalCer), a compound originally derived from the marine sponge Agelas mauritanius  with no physiological role but great research utility.
 α-glucuronyl- and α-galacturonyl- ceramides, a family of compounds of microbial origin which can be found, for example, on the cell wall of Sphingomonas, a ubiquitous Gram-negative  bacterium. The related β-D-glucopyranosylceramide is accumulated in antigen-presenting cells after infection, where it serves to activate invariant NKTs (iNKTs), a special kind of NKT.
 iGb3, a self antigen which has been implied in iNKT selection.
 HS44, a synthetic amino cyclitolic ceramide analogue which has less contact with the TCR, activating iNKTs in a more constrained way than α-GalCer (specially in relation to Th2 cytokines production) and thus being more interesting for therapeutic use.

CD1d tetramers
CD1d tetramers are protein constructs composed of four CD1d molecules joined together and usually fluorescently labelled, used to identify NKT cells or other CD1d-reactive cells. In particular, type I NKT cells and some type II NKT cells are stained by them. A differentiation of these two types can be obtained in human by using an antibody against the TCR Vα24 chain, which is specific of type I NKT cells.

Although they are the most widely used of CD1d oligomers, sometimes CD1d dimers (two units) or pentamers (five units) are used instead.

References

Further reading

External links
 
 
 

Glycoproteins